Busnes is a commune in the Pas-de-Calais department in the Hauts-de-France region in northern France.

Geography

History
In 1346, in retaliation for having besieged the town of Bethune, Flemish bands, commissioned by Oudart of Renty, sacked many of the neighbouring villages and particularly Busnes. The inhabitants took refuge in the church in order to protect themselves. The church was strengthened to make it more resilient to attacks. 
In 1383, English troops pillaged and plundered the village, on their rampages during the Hundred Years War. 
In 1519, the church was badly damaged and had to be rebuilt. 
From 1537 to 1543, during the time of wars of religion and again in 1655, the Spanish and French came in their turn,  causing fires and terrible destruction.  
During revolutionary turmoil in 1793, demagogues from Saint-Venant decided to come to Busnes to burn the statues of the Saints in the church. The patriots of Busnes resisted valiantly and thus prevented further destruction. 
During the French Revolution, the church was sold and became a public building, which, in turn, served as a club, dance hall and gunpowder factory.
It was not until February 20, 1802 that it again became a place of worship.
The church, which over the centuries had been badly burned and repaired, was finally demolished in 1870. Construction of the new church started in the following years. The village was awarded the Croix de Guerre after World War I.

Population

Sights
 The church of St. Paul, dating from the nineteenth century.
 The chateau of Beaulieu.
 The chateau of Quesnoy, dating from the seventeenth century.
 The Commonwealth War Graves Commission cemetery.
 The war memorial.

Famous residents
 Busnes may be the origin of the surname of the composer Antoine Busnois, who is known to have come from the area.

See also
 Communes of the Pas-de-Calais department

References

External links

  Official Web site 
 The CWGC graves in the Busnes communal cemetery

Communes of Pas-de-Calais